Leptozestis strophicodes is a moth in the family Cosmopterigidae. It was described by Edward Meyrick in 1917. It is found in Australia, where it has been recorded from Queensland.

References

Cosmopteriginae
Moths described in 1917